"" ("Serenade"), WAB 84.2, is a Lied composed by Anton Bruckner in .

History 
Bruckner composed this serenade, which he dedicated to Mrs. Schlager, the wife of the mayor of St. Florian, during the beginning of his stay in St. Florian. For the composition Bruckner used a text, which he had already used for the unfinished lied , WAB 84.1.

It is not known when the piece was performed. The work, of which the original manuscript is stored in the archive of the Liedertafel Frohsinn, was first issued in Band II/2, pp. 61–64 of the Göllerich/Auer biography. It was thereafter issued in 1954, together with Sternschnuppen, in the Chorblattreihe of Robitschek, Vienna.

Text 

Ständchen is using a text of an unknown author (possibly Ernst Marinelli).

Music 
The 29-bar long work in 6/8 is in G major. It is scored for  quartet and tenor soloist. During the first 18 bars the text is sung by the tenor soloist with accompaniment of humming voices. From bar 19, the second part is sung again by the men's quartet.

Discography 

There is a single recording of Bruckner's Ständchen:
 Thomas Kerbl, Quartet of the Männerchorvereinigung Bruckner 12, Michael Nowak (tenor), Weltliche Männerchöre – CD: LIVA 054, 2012

References

Sources 
 August Göllerich, Anton Bruckner. Ein Lebens- und Schaffens-Bild,  – posthumous edited by Max Auer by G. Bosse, Regensburg, 1932
 Anton Bruckner – Sämtliche Werke, Band XXIII/2:  Weltliche Chorwerke (1843–1893), Musikwissenschaftlicher Verlag der Internationalen Bruckner-Gesellschaft, Angela Pachovsky and Anton Reinthaler (editor), Vienna, 1989
 Uwe Harten, Anton Bruckner. Ein Handbuch. , Salzburg, 1996. .
 Cornelis van Zwol, Anton Bruckner 1824–1896 – Leven en werken, uitg. Thoth, Bussum, Netherlands, 2012. 
 Crawford Howie, Anton Bruckner - A documentary biography, online revised edition

External links 
 
 Ständchen G-Dur, WAB 84 – Critical discography by Hans Roelofs 

Weltliche Chorwerke by Anton Bruckner
1846 compositions
Compositions in G major